William Arthur Spittle (19 March 1893 – 12 February 1979) was an English professional footballer who played in the Football League for Leicester City and Arsenal as an inside forward.

Personal life 
Spittle served as a corporal in the Football Battalion during the First World War. A gunshot wound to the left shoulder led to his discharge in May 1918.

Honours 
Nuneaton Town
 Nuneaton Charity Cup: 1921

Career statistics

References

English footballers
English Football League players
Association football inside forwards
Arsenal F.C. players
Leicester City F.C. players
Southern Football League players
Tamworth F.C. players
1893 births
1979 deaths
Footballers from the London Borough of Wandsworth
Nuneaton Borough F.C. players
British Army personnel of World War I
Middlesex Regiment soldiers